Federal Hill Historic District may refer to:

Federal Hill Historic District (Bristol, Connecticut), listed on the National Register of Historic Places in Hartford County, Connecticut
Federal Hill, Baltimore, a Baltimore, Maryland neighborhood which includes NRHP-listed Federal Hill Historic District and Federal Hill South Historic District
Federal Hill Historic District (Lynchburg, Virginia), listed on the National Register of Historic Places in Lynchburg, Virginia

See also
Federal Hill (disambiguation)